Dooland Philip Buultjens (23 August 1933 – 25 April 2004) was a Sri Lankan cricket umpire. He stood in three Test matches between 1984 and 1986 and 18 ODI games between 1983 and 1992.

See also
 List of Test cricket umpires
 List of One Day International cricket umpires

References

1933 births
2004 deaths
People from Northern Province, Sri Lanka
Sri Lankan Test cricket umpires
Sri Lankan One Day International cricket umpires